The name Karma Chagme refers to a 17th-century Tibetan Buddhist (Vajrayāna) lama and to the tülku (reincarnate lama) lineage which he initiated. Including the first, seven Karma Chagme tülkus have been recognized. The Neydo Kagyu sub-school of the Karma Kagyu was established by the first Karma Chagme, Rāga Asya.

The First Karma Chagme, Rāga Asya
Karma Chakme (born Wangdrak Sung; ordained Karma chags med; alias Rā-ga a-sya; 1613-1678) was born in Salmo Gang, a place near Riwoche in the district of Ngoms in Kham.  His father, Pema Wangdrak was an established tantric siddha from the ruling lineage of Dong khachö and his mother Chökyong Kyi was descended from the family line of Gyuli. Said to have been the reincarnation of Chokro Lü Gyeltsen and of Prince Sad na legs, his father gave his son the tertön Ratna Lingpa longevity empowerments during his birth.

Karma Chakme was trained by his father from the age of six in reading and writing, as well as “white” and “black” astrology, geomancy and magic ceremonies for the purpose of averting misfortunes. He was also taught the entire cycle of Nyingma teachings, which he had learned from his father, and continued his training with the most famous Nyingma and Kagyu masters of his time.

He attained mastery of the sūtras and tantras at zad ma gyi monastery and received, at the age of twenty, ordination and the transmission of Mahamudra from the 6th Shamar Rinpoche Mipan Chökyi Wangchuk (1584-1630) at Tsurphu Monastery.  He received empowerment during his visit. Then he traveled with the Karmapa for a year and a half achieving fame in Tibet. Karma Chakme's public examination was before 12,000 monks at the Great Prayer Festival of Karma Kagyu.

A contender for the post of 10th Karmapa, he was not confirmed but retained the ordination name Karma Chakme.

He was known for being a prolific writer and scholar, for his ardent devotion to the cult of Sukhāvatī and for being the teacher of tertön Namchö Mingyur Dorje, who revealed a unique cycle of terma known as the Nam Cho. Karma Chakme was credited as a mahasiddha attaining an authentic emanation of Jinasagara, the "Red Avalokiteśvara". Karma Chags med  was a formidable scholar and prolific author who composed some sixty volumes of texts on a variety of subjects while in retreat. He is perhaps best-known for his contributions to the Tibetan genre of Pure Land literature, with his Aspiration Prayer to the Pure Land Sukhāvatī and its commentary which are widely considered classic texts of the demön(bde smom) genre. Among his many works belonging to the Nam Cho cycle, The Mind Treasure of the Sky Dharma: A Compilation of Extensive Instructions for Transferring to Sukhāvatī (Gnam chos thugs kyi gter kha las bde chen zhing du 'pho ba'i gdams pa rgyas  par bsgrigs pa) is an important commentary on the Vajrayāna practice of phowa

The biography of the first Karma Chakme is based on the following sources: gTer ston brgya rtsa’i rnam thar (513-16); mKhas grub Karma chags med rin po che’i gsung ’bum gyi dkar chag (introduction); Tsering Lama (1988: 35-44); and Chagmé (1998: 7-11).

The Most Recent (7th) Karma Chagme
The most recent Nédo throne holder of Tashi Chöeling Monastery was Karma Tendzin Trinlé Künkhyap Pelzangpo. His seat was Néydo Tashi Chöeling Monastery in  Setidevi Bhanjyang, Nepal, which is near Pharping, a Buddhist pilgrimage site in the Kathmandu Valley. Rinpoche died on 3 October 2013, attended by Ogyen Trinley Dorje the 17th Gyalwa Karmapa and Dragpa Tenpa Yarpel the 12th Goshir Gyaltsab Rinpoche. The 8th Karma Chagme Rinpoche has not yet been identified.

Karma Chagme Tülku Lineage
 Karma Chagme Raga Asya (1613-1678)
 Choktrül Trinley Wangchuk
 Trinley Tendzin
 Khyapdak Tendzin Trinley
 Sang Ngak Tendzin
 Karma Tsultrim Namgyal
 Karma Tendzin Trinley Kunkhyab Pal Zangbo (1926-2013)

Notes

References

Tsering Lama Jampal Zangpo. 1988. A Garland of Immortal Wish-fulfilling Trees: The Palyul Tradition of Nyingmapa. Ithaca: Snow Lion.

Chagmé, Karma 2000. Naked Awareness: Practical Instructions on the Union of Mahāmudrā and Dzogchen. Translated by A. Wallace. Ithaca: Snow Lion.

Chagmé, Karma 2009. A Spacious Path to Freedom: Practical Instructions on Union of Mahamudra and Atiyoga.  Commentary by Gyatrul Rinpoche, Translated by A. Wallace. Ithaca: Snow Lion.

Tibetan Buddhist Resource Center (https://web.archive.org/web/20100403121728/http://www.tbrc.org/index.xq)

Karma Kagyu lamas
Nyingma lamas
Rinpoches
Tibetan Buddhists from Tibet
Tertöns
Tulkus